Mohammed Samir Saleh Qasem (born 17 January 1987) is a Palestinian footballer who plays as a midfielder for  club Sagesse.

Club career
In July 2022, Qasem signed for Lebanese Premier League side Sagesse.

Honours
Al-Ittihad Tripoli
 Libyan Super Cup: 2010

Nejmeh
 Lebanese Premier League: 2013–14
 Lebanese FA Cup: 2015–16
 Lebanese Elite Cup: 2014
 Lebanese Super Cup: 2014

Bourj
 Lebanese Challenge Cup: 2019

References

External links
 
 
 
 
 

1987 births
Living people
People from Tripoli, Libya
Palestinian footballers
Association football midfielders
Al-Ittihad Club (Tripoli) players
Al-Wahda SC (Tripoli) players
Nejmeh SC players
Safa SC players
Al Ansar FC players
Bekaa SC players
Bourj FC players
Sagesse SC footballers
Libyan Premier League players
Lebanese Premier League players
Palestine international footballers
Palestinian expatriate footballers
Expatriate footballers in Libya
Expatriate footballers in Lebanon
Palestinian expatriate sportspeople in Libya
Palestinian expatriate sportspeople in Lebanon